Lipowy Dwór  is a village in the administrative district of Gmina Miłki, within Giżycko County, Warmian-Masurian Voivodeship, in northern Poland.

The village has a population of 80.

Notable residents
 Paul Gratzik (born 1935), author

References

Villages in Giżycko County